Bruce Chambers (born 23 September 1959) is a former Australian rules footballer who played 1 game for Fitzroy in the Victorian Football League (VFL) in 1980.

Notes

External links 

1959 births
Living people
Australian rules footballers from Victoria (Australia)
Fitzroy Football Club players
Koroit Football Club players